The Klehini River is a large, glacially fed stream in the vicinity of Haines in the U.S. state of Alaska.

The Klehini River is renowned for its salmon runs, its biannual congregation of bald eagles—the second largest in the Haines area after the Chilkat River's Council Grounds—and for the Klehini Falls. The Klehini also delineates the northern boundary of the Chilkat Range.

The name Klehini appears to be derived from the Tlingit phrase l’éiw héeni, which translates to river with sand or gravel in it.   The Klehini River contains abundances of both sand and gravel.

The lower Klehini is located within the Alaska Chilkat Bald Eagle Preserve.

Walt Disney's 1991 rendition of White Fang was filmed along the Klehini River.

Klehini Falls

The Klehini Falls are a series of four cataracts in far northwestern British Columbia occurring in a narrow gorge near the headwaters of the Klehini River. The falls are separated from one another by a distance of approximately 300 feet (91 m), with an average plunge of 30 to 40 feet (9.1 to 12.2 m). The individual cataracts are currently unnamed.

See also
List of rivers of Alaska
List of British Columbia rivers

References

Rivers of Haines Borough, Alaska
Rivers of Alaska
Rivers of the Boundary Ranges
Atlin District
International rivers of North America